Salix cavaleriei is a large tree from the genus of willow (Salix) with a gray-brown, furrowed bark. The natural range of the species is in China. It is planted for logging and for fastening embankments.

Description
The trunk bark is gray-brown and furrowed. The twigs are reddish brown and thin, young twigs are finely tomentose and later bald. Older branches turn gray-brown. The foliage leaves have triangular-egg-shaped, serrated stipules. Both leaf sides are initially reddish, later glabrous, the upper side green, the underside greenish.

The peduncle is long and forms two or three, rarely four leaves. The bracts are ovate-rounded to triangular, ciliate and hairy down on both sides. Male flowers have two nectar glands and six to eight rarely up to twelve stamens . The bracts resemble those of the male catkin. Female flowers also have two nectar glands. The ovary is stalked. Salix cavaleriei flowers when the leaves shoot from March to April, the fruits ripen from April to May.

Range
The natural range is in the Chinese provinces of Guangxi, Guizhou, Sichuan, and Yunnan. It grows along rivers and in damp forest edges at altitudes of 1800 to 2500 meters.

Taxonomy
Salix cavaleriei is a species from the genus of willows (Salix) in the willow family (Salicaceae). There, it is the section Wilsonia assigned. It was described scientifically for the first time in 1909 by Augustin Hector Léveillé. The genus name Salix is Latin and has been from the Romans used for various willow species.

Synonyms of the species are Pleiarina cavaleriei (H.Lév.) N.Chao & GTGong, Salix polyandra H.Lév. , Salix pyi H.Lév. , Salix yunnanensis H.Lév.

Use
Salix cavaleriei is used to fortify embankments and serves as a supplier of wood.

Literature
Wu Zheng-yi, Peter H. Raven (Ed.): Flora of China . Volume 4: Cycadaceae through Fagaceae . Science Press / Missouri Botanical Garden Press, Beijing / St. Louis 1999, pp. 171, 174.
Helmut Genaust: Etymologisches Wörterbuch der botanischen Pflanzennamen 3rd, completely revised and expanded edition. Nikol, Hamburg 2005, p. 552 (reprint from 1996) (in German).

References 

cavaleriei